Dufauxia zikani is a species of beetle in the family Cerambycidae. It was described by Lane in 1970.

References

Acanthoderini
Beetles described in 1970